Infosphere or InfoSphere may refer to the following:

 Infosphere, a term used to speculate about the common evolution of the Internet, society and culture
 IBM InfoSphere DataStage, an ETL software tool and part of the IBM Information Platforms Solutions suite that uses a graphical notation to construct data integration solutions
 The Infosphere, a massive biological memory bank in the animated series Futurama